The 2006 African Women's Championship was the seventh edition of the African Women's Championship (now known as the Africa Women Cup of Nations), the biennial international football championship organised by the Confederation of African Football (CAF) for the women's national teams of Africa. It was held in Nigeria between 28 October and 11 November 2006.

The tournament was originally scheduled to be held in Gabon, but the country withdrew from hosting the competition due to organisational reasons. The CAF awarded the hosting of the competition to Nigeria in May 2006.

Initially, the tournament was scheduled for September 2006, but it was moved to October due to weather considerations.

The tournament determined the CAF's two qualifiers for the 2007 FIFA Women's World Cup — the winner Nigeria and the runner-up Ghana. Nigeria won its seventh consecutive title, beating Ghana 1–0 in the final. South African Portia Modise was named player of the championship.

Qualification

Gabon qualified automatically as hosts, while the remaining seven spots were determined by the qualifying rounds, which took place from March to August 2006. 

Before Gabon's withdrawal, Nigeria entered qualification and was scheduled to play Equatorial Guinea in the second round. After CAF elected Nigeria as replacement hosts, the match was called off and both teams qualified for the final tournament. Gabon did not retain its automatic qualification and therefore, was excluded from the tournament.

Format
Qualification ties were played on a home-and-away two-legged basis. If the aggregate score was tied after the second leg, the away goals rule would be applied, and if still level, the penalty shoot-out would be used to determine the winner (no extra time would be played).

The seven winners of the final round qualified for the final tournament.

Qualified teams

Equatorial Guinea appeared for the first time in the tournament.  

1 Bold indicates champions for that year. Italic indicates hosts for that year.

Final tournament

First round
The finals took place in Warri at Warri Township Stadium. There was two groups, A and B, with a semi-finals and finals.

Group A
Equatorial Guinea arrived at Murtala Mohammed Airport in a private chartered plane, which did not have clearance to land. The players were not allowed to disembark for three hours, and despite organising officials trying to remedy the situation, the Equatorial Guinea players apparently left for home, unhappy with the treatment they received by airport officials. However, their first match went ahead on time.

Group B

Semi-finals
Winners qualified for the 2007 FIFA Women's World Cup.

Third place match

Final match

25,000 people watched the match, which was described by the BBC as "a drab encounter".

Awards

References and notes

External links
Tables & results at RSSSF.com
Tables & results at BBC.co.uk